Auditorio Miguel Barragan is a 3,400-seat indoor arena located in San Luis Potosí City, Mexico.  Located in the Unidad Deportiva Adolfo Lopez Mateos sports complex, it is used for basketball, concerts, lucha libre, boxing and other events.

References

Miguel Barragan
Buildings and structures in San Luis Potosí
Boxing venues in Mexico
Volleyball venues in Mexico
Basketball venues in Mexico